Duncan (pop. 5,047 in 2021) is a city on southern Vancouver Island in British Columbia, Canada. It is the smallest city by area (2.07 square kilometres, 0.8 square miles) in Canada. It was incorporated in 1912.

Location 
The city is about 45 kilometres from both Victoria to the south and Nanaimo to the north.

Although the City of Duncan has a population of just over 5,000, it serves the Cowichan Valley which has a population of approximately 84,000, many of whom live in North Cowichan and Cowichan Tribes. This gives Duncan a much larger perceived "greater" population than that contained within the city limits. People in areas of North Cowichan and bordering on Duncan usually use "Duncan" as their mailing address.

Duncan has one seat on the Cowichan Valley Regional District Board. The name Cowichan is an Anglicization of Halkomelem , which means "the warm land".

Transportation 
The city is served by Trans-Canada Highway which connects the city to points north/south. Highway 1 through Duncan is a four-lane street with two signalized intersections (within the city limits) and a speed limit of 50 km/hr. British Columbia Highway 18 connects Duncan (via North Cowichan) to the town of Lake Cowichan to the west.

The Island Rail Corridor railway line still passes through Duncan along the coast of Vancouver Island, but trains have long since stopped running on it. Both freight service and the Crown corporation VIA Rail passenger service have been suspended due to deferred maintenance on the rail line.

Public transit is provided in conjunction between BC Transit and the Cowichan Valley Regional Transit System. The service provides connections from Duncan to the surrounding communities as well as regular commuter bus service to Victoria.

The Nanaimo Regional Transit System provides daily (except Sunday) bus service between Duncan and Nanaimo including a stop at the Nanaimo Airport.

History 
The community is named after William Chalmers Duncan (born 1836 in Sarnia, Ontario). He arrived in Victoria in May 1862, then in August of that year he was one of the party of a 78 settlers which Governor Douglas took to Cowichan Bay. After going off on several gold rushes, Duncan settled close to the present City of Duncan. He married in 1876, and his son Kenneth became the first Mayor of Duncan. There is a Kenneth Street, as well as a Duncan Street, in the City.

Duncan's farm was named Alderlea, and this was the first name of the adjacent settlement. In August 1886, the Esquimalt and Nanaimo Railway was opened. No stop had been scheduled at Alderlea for the inaugural train bearing Sir John A. Macdonald and Robert Dunsmuir. However, at Duncan's Crossing, the level crossing nearest Alderlea, a crowd of 2,000 had assembled around a decorated arch and the train came to an unplanned halt. According to this legend, a train station was established at the settlement and the city built around it. Initially part of the District of North Cowichan, Duncan felt its needs as an urban settlement in the largely rural municipality were not being met, in particular the need to have proper roadways. After a particularly wet winter in 1911–1912, a vote was held to make Duncan a distinct city, and it was incorporated on March 4, 1912. With the enlargement of North Cowichan in the ensuing decades, there was an effort to re-unite the two municipalities, though a referndum on the matter in June 1978 was soundly defeated.

In the early 1900s, Duncan's Chinatown was the social centre for the Cowichan Valley's Chinese population. Chinatown was concentrated in a single block in the southwestern corner of Duncan. At its largest point, Duncan's Chinatown included six Chinese families and 30 merchants who supplied goods and services to the loggers, millworkers, cannery and mine workers in the area. The city tore the buildings down in 1969 to build a new law courts complex. Some materials from the original buildings were used at Whippletree Junction.

In the 1980s, the city was noted in coverage related to the 1985 bombings at Narita Airport in Japan and aboard Air India Flight 182, Canada's largest murder case. Resident Inderjit Singh Reyat purchased bomb parts and a radio at Duncan stores, and used the radio to conceal the bomb. Less than two weeks prior to the bombings, Reyat and suspected Air India mastermind Talwinder Singh Parmar were observed testing explosives in the woods outside of Duncan by the Canadian Security Intelligence Service (CSIS).

Demographics 

Ethnicity

Religion 
According to the 2021 census, religious groups in Duncan included:
Irreligion (2,780 persons or 59.8%)
Christianity (1,590 persons or 34.2%)
Indigenous Spirituality (45 persons or 1.0%)
Sikhism (30 persons or 0.6%)
Judaism (25 persons or 0.5%)
Buddhism (20 persons or 0.4%)
Islam (15 persons or 0.3%)
Other (140 persons or 3.0%)

Attractions 
The City of Duncan was incorporated in 1912 and is known for one of the largest totem pole collections.  The City was officially named "City of Totems" in 1985. The City had 44 totem poles in the collection, however one was destroyed in an auto accident, one was gifted to Kaikohe, New Zealand and one returned to earth. In 2007, the City of Duncan deemed copyright privileges of the totem poles. The use of the totems' images for commercial purposes requires the City of Duncan's approval. The Cowichan Historical Society (Museum) provides free totem tours in the summer months.

Duncan has a large Indigenous community and is the traditional home of the Cowichan Tribes, who are the largest band among the Coast Salish people. The Coast Salish men and women of the Cowichan Tribes are makers of the world-famous Cowichan Sweaters.

Before the Canada–United States softwood lumber dispute, Duncan and the whole Cowichan Valley were a thriving lumber centre in British Columbia.

Cowichan Community Centre is located in the jurisdiction of the Municipality of North Cowichan, and serves purpose for all citizens in the Cowichan Valley Regional District (CVRD), including swimming and skating facilities. The centre has the world's largest hockey stick which was made specifically for Expo 86 in Vancouver, and purchased by CVRD at the end of the event.

In 1911, Norman Corfield drove the first car over the Malahat Highway, opening up vehicle traffic to Duncan. Construction of the Duncan Garage Heritage Building started in 1912 and appeared in Canadian Motorist Magazine (May 1913 issue) as "The most complete and up-to-date fireproof garage on Vancouver Island." The Duncan Garage set a provincial record for the longest operating business in one location (65 years). It was designated a heritage building in 2002.

Climate
According to the Köppen climate classification, Duncan has a warm-summer Mediterranean climate (Köppen Csb).

Education 
Duncan is part of British Columbia's School District 79 Cowichan Valley. It has one independent school. Queen Margaret's School, established in 1921, as a private secondary university preparatory school which includes a co-ed junior school.

Vancouver Island University (formerly Malaspina University-College) has a regional campus in the Municipality of North Cowichan, bordering Duncan, that offers a Bachelor of Education degree as well as programs and courses in university transfer, access, trades and applied technology, health and human services, and career and academic preparation. The campus also has a Continuing Education department that offers certificate programs, personal and professional development courses, and online courses. The current  campus opened for classes in June 2011.

Also bordering Duncan in the Municipality of North Cowichan, there are two public secondary schools, Cowichan Secondary School, and Quamichan Secondary School, as well as several elementary schools. The head offices of School District 79 Cowichan Valley are also located in North Cowichan. In the Cowichan region there are also has two denominational independent schools: Queen of Angels (Catholic school), serving preschool to Grade 9 students, and Duncan Christian School, whose campus is home to both an independent elementary and high school. Sunrise Waldorf School is a non-denominational K-8 independent school offering Waldorf education in the Cowichan Valley.

Sports 
The Cowichan Community Sportsplex is located on the border of Duncan, but in the Municipality of North Cowichan and is the home of the British Columbia Hockey League's Cowichan Valley Capitals, who play in the Cowichan Community Sportsplex. It is home to a number of other sports and athletics organizations including the Cowichan Valley Athletic Club's (CVAC) Jaguars one of the many clubs and teams that practice & compete out of the extensive Cowichan Sportsplex. G.T. Corfield the father of Norman Corfield (of Duncan Garage and Corfield Motors of Courtenay, Nanaimo and Pt. Alberni in the day) was one of three families ( A. Pimbury and F. Maitland-Dougall) that founded the South Cowichan Lawn Tennis Club in 1887. Designated a Heritage site in 1991. It still exists today. South Cowichan Lawn Tennis Club South Cowichan Lawn Tennis Club

Notable people 
''See also :Category:People from Duncan, British Columbia
 Greg Adams, former NHL player
 Robin Bawa, former NHL player
 Michael Bigg, marine biologist
 Doug Bodger, former NHL player
 Dylan Coghlan, NHL player for the Carolina Hurricanes
 Geoff Courtnall, former NHL player
 Russ Courtnall, former NHL player
 Mac DeMarco, solo musician and songwriter
 Matt Ellison, former NHL player
 Kevin Hamilton, diplomat
 Charles Ferguson Hoey, Victoria Cross recipient
 Mike Sweeney, former soccer player (played for Canada at the 1986 World Cup)
 David H. Turpin, current president of the University of Alberta
 Jonathan Whitesell, Canadian actor
 Al Wilson, former CFL player
 Gary Lee, Canadian representative Bull Rider

Gallery

See also 
 Paldi, British Columbia
 St. Clare's Monastery

Notes

References

External links 
 
 

 
1912 establishments in British Columbia
Cities in British Columbia
Logging communities in Canada
Populated places on the British Columbia Coast